Lt. General Kyaw Swe is the former Minister of Home Affairs of Myanmar, in office from 2016 to 2020. Previously, he served as Commander of South-west Command in Pathein, Ayeyarwady Region.

Early life and education
Kyaw Swe was born on 27 November 1959 to Mya Soe and Daw Kyi in Thepyintaw, Kyaukpadaung Township, Mandalay Division (now Mandalay Region, Myanmar).

Controversy 
In 2017, after the assassination of Ko Ni, a prominent constitutional lawyer and Burmese Muslim, allegations emerged that Kyaw Swe had orchestrated the killing. The assistant secretary of the Home Affairs Ministry, Maung Maung Myint, issued a statement on 1 February 2017, denying the allegations as "rumors."

Kyaw Swe was also named as the military officer who fabricated charges against Saffron Revolution leader U Gambira on 19 January 2016. The Human Rights Council Working Group on Arbitrary Detention confirmed in their report (Opinion No. 33/2016) that U Gambira's arrest and subsequent conviction to be Deprivation of Liberty. The deprivation of liberty of Mr. Gambira was arbitrary, being in “Contravention with Articles 10 and 13 of the Universal Declaration of Human Rights (UDHR)”; it falls within category II of the categories applicable to the consideration of the cases submitted to the Working Group. To date, the Myanmar government have not addressed any of The Human Rights Council's recommendations, and have denied all findings.

Personal life
He is married to Win Win Maw, and has two children, Ei Pyae Pyae Phyo and Khant Sithu.

References 

Living people
Government ministers of Myanmar
Burmese generals
Year of birth missing (living people)